Dragalovci is a village in the municipality of Stanari, Bosnia and Herzegovina.

The popular singer Indira Radić is from this village.

References

Villages in Republika Srpska
Populated places in Doboj